Love is a Verb is a 2014 documentary film directed by Terry Spencer Hesser and narrated by Ashley Judd. The documentary focuses on the Turkish Muslim scholar Fethullah Gülen and the Gulen movement.

References

External links

2014 films
2014 documentary films
Documentary films about Islam
Documentary films about religion
American documentary films
2010s English-language films
2010s American films